Zhao Hong ( – February 1225) was a Crown Prince of the Song dynasty, the heir apparent of Emperor Ningzong.

Biography
Zhao Hong was the adopted son of Zhao Kai, who in turn was the biological son of Emperor Xiaozong. Zhao Hong was therefore, an adopted cousin of the reigning Emperor Ningzong.

When the Crown Prince Zhao Xun died in 1220 from dysentery, Emperor Ningzong asked for a boy at least 14 years old to adopt. Zhao Hong was selected, adopted, and installed as Crown Prince in 1221.

Deposal 
The powerful chancellor Shi Miyuan did not want Hong to succeed Ningzong when he died because Shi Miyuan once found Zhao Hong sober and passed out on his quarters and in 1223, a lute-playing girl forced to act like a spy by Shi Miyuan spied on Zhao Hong and reported to Shi that once Zhao Hong would become Emperor, he would banish and exile Shi Miyuan and subordinates to the far south. Shi Miyuan not wanting to lose his power decided to send his ally Yu Tianxi to locate a suitable heir. Yu found Zhao Yuju, a minor official in Shaoxing and sent him to Shi. Shi decided to groom him as the potential heir renaming him Zhao Guicheng and forced Empress Yang onto the plot.

When Emperor Ningzong died, Shi Miyuan first brought Zhao Guicheng into the throne room and put him on the throne and then called Zhao Hong into the room without any bodyguards. Shi Miyuan then said that Zhao Guicheng was now the Emperor sparking protests from Zhao Hong until he was forced to bow in recognition of Zhao Guicheng. Zhao Hong was moved to a nearby prefecture, Huzhou where he could live in luxury.

Death 
Zhao Hong was persuaded to join a rebellion after much resistance from him. He was however defeated after two weeks. He was executed by strangulation in February 1225.

References 

	
	

	
	

1225 deaths
Song dynasty princes
Executed Song dynasty people
Deaths by strangulation
Heirs apparent who never acceded